Maine School Administrative District 7 (MSAD 7) is an operating school district within Maine, covering the town of North Haven.

References 

07
07